is a former Japanese football player.

Playing career
Tominaga was born in Fukui Prefecture on August 27, 1976. After graduating from Kokushikan University, he joined J1 League club Nagoya Grampus Eight in 1999. Although he played as forward, he could hardly play in the match until 2000. In 2001, he moved to J2 League club Sagan Tosu. Although he played forward, he was converted to center back in late 2001. In 2002, he moved to J2 club Shonan Bellmare and played many matches as center back. In 2003, he returned to Nagoya Grampus Eight. However he could hardly play in the match. In 2004, he moved to J2 club Ventforet Kofu. He became a regular player as defensive midfielder. In 2005, he moved to J2 club Yokohama FC. He played many matches as many position as substitute. In 2006, although the club won the champions and was promoted to J1 from 2007, he could not play many matches. In 2008, he moved to Japan Football League club TDK (later Blaublitz Akita). He retired end of 2010 season.

Club statistics

References

External links

1976 births
Living people
Kokushikan University alumni
Association football people from Fukui Prefecture
Japanese footballers
J1 League players
J2 League players
Japan Football League players
Nagoya Grampus players
Sagan Tosu players
Shonan Bellmare players
Ventforet Kofu players
Yokohama FC players
Blaublitz Akita players
Association football defenders